Kristo is a male given name.

People named Kristo include:
Kristo Dako (1876–1941), Albanian patriot and publisher 
Kristo Das Pal (1839–1884), Indian publicist
Kristo Floqi (1872–1951), Albanian patriot, playwright, politician, and lawyer
Kristo Galeta (born 1983), Estonian shot putter
Kristo Kirka (1883-1955), Albanian patriot, diplomat, politician and activist
Kristo Kollo (born 1990), Estonian volleyball and beach volleyball player 
Kristo Kono (1907–1991), Albanian composer 
Kristo Kraag (born 1979), Estonian rally co-driver
Kristo Luarasi (1876–1934), Albanian nationalist figure and publisher 
Kristo Mangelsoo (born 1993), Estonian basketball player
Kristo Meksi (1849–1931), Albanian politician
Kristo Negovani (1875–1905), Albanian nationalist figure, religious leader and writer
Kristo Numpuby (21st century), guitarist and singer
Kristo Robo (born 1948), Albanian competitive shooter
Kristo Saage (born 1985), Estonian basketball player
Kristo Shuli (1858–1938), Albanian photographer and writer
Kristo Tohver (born 1981), Estonian football referee

References

Albanian masculine given names
Estonian masculine given names